The Port Harcourt Male Ensemble (PHME) is an all-male choral group based in Port Harcourt, the capital of Rivers State, Nigeria. It was founded in 1998 and inaugurated on 5 May 2001. PHME is dedicated to the promotion and advancement of African classical music. The artistic director is Bob Amunye.

In 2015, the group won the Commonwealth Community Choir Competition and was also
awarded the National Award of
Excellence for Most Outstanding Youth Organization in Nigeria.

See also
Music of Port Harcourt
List of Nigerian musical groups

References

Musical groups from Port Harcourt
Musical groups established in 2001
Boys' and men's choirs
2001 establishments in Nigeria
2000s establishments in Rivers State